Wake Forest University is a private research university in Winston-Salem, North Carolina. Founded in 1834, the university received its name from its original location in Wake Forest, north of Raleigh, North Carolina. The Reynolda Campus, the university's main campus, has been located north of downtown Winston-Salem since the university moved there in 1956. The Atrium Health Wake Forest Baptist medical campus has two locations, the older one located near the Ardmore neighborhood in central Winston-Salem, and the newer campus at Wake Forest Innovation Quarter downtown. The university also occupies lab space at Biotech Plaza at Innovation Quarter, and at the Center for Nanotechnology and Molecular Materials. The university's Graduate School of Management maintains a presence on the main campus in Winston-Salem and in Charlotte, North Carolina.

WFU's undergraduate and graduate colleges and schools include Wake Forest University School of Law, Wake Forest University School of Divinity, Wake Forest University School of Business, Wake Forest Graduate School of Arts and Sciences, and Wake Forest University School of Medicine. Students can participate in over 250 student clubs and organizations including fraternities and sororities, intramural sports, a student newspaper and a radio station. The university is classified among "R-2: Doctoral Universities – High Research Activity".

Wake Forest alumni include 15 Rhodes Scholars, including 13 since 1986, four Marshall Scholars, 15 Truman Scholars and 92 Fulbright recipients since 1993. Notable people of Wake Forest University include author Maya Angelou, mathematician Phillip Griffiths, Senators Richard Burr and Kay Hagan, former sportscaster and athlete Billy Packer, athletes Chris Paul, Tim Duncan, Muggsy Bogues, Brian Piccolo and Arnold Palmer, and CEO Charlie Ergen.

Wake Forest University Athletic teams are known as the Demon Deacons and compete in 16 NCAA Division I intercollegiate sports. Wake Forest is also a founding member of the Atlantic Coast Conference (ACC).

History
During the Baptist State Convention of 1833 at Cartledge Creek Baptist Church in Rockingham, North Carolina, establishment of Wake Forest Institute was ratified. The school was founded after the North Carolina Baptist State Convention purchased a  plantation from Calvin Jones in an area north of Raleigh (Wake County) called the "Forest of Wake". The new school, designed to teach both Baptist ministers and laymen, opened on February 3, 1834, as the Wake Forest Manual Labor Institute. Students and staff were required to spend half of each day doing manual labor on its plantation. Samuel Wait, a Baptist minister, was selected as the principal, later president, of the institute.

Wake Forest College

In 1838, the school was renamed Wake Forest College, and the manual labor system was abandoned. The town that grew up around the college came to be called the town of Wake Forest. In 1862, during the American Civil War, the school closed due to the loss of most students and some faculty to service in the Confederate States Army. The college re-opened in 1866 and prospered over the next four decades under the leadership of presidents Washington Manly Wingate, Thomas H. Pritchard, and Charles Taylor. In 1894, the School of Law was established, followed by the School of Medicine in 1902. In 1911 Louise Heims Beck became the university's first librarian, later going on to become a vaudeville performer and the recipient of a Tony Award. The university held its first summer session in 1921. Lea Laboratory was built in 1887–1888, and was listed on the National Register of Historic Places in 1975.

The leading college figure in the early 20th century was William L. Poteat, a gifted biologist and the first layman to be elected president in the college's history. "Dr. Billy" continued to promote growth, hired many outstanding professors, and expanded the science curriculum. He also stirred upheaval among North Carolina Baptists with his strong support of teaching the theory of evolution but eventually won formal support from the Baptist State Convention for academic freedom at the college.

Move to Winston-Salem

The School of Medicine moved to Winston-Salem (then North Carolina's second-largest city) in 1941 under the supervision of Dean Coy Cornelius Carpenter, who guided the school through the transition from a two-year to a four-year program. The school then became the Bowman Gray School of Medicine. The following year, 1942, Wake Forest admitted its first female undergraduate students, after World War II dramatically depleted the pool of male students.

In 1946, as a result of large gifts from the Z. Smith Reynolds Foundation, the entire college agreed to move to Winston-Salem, a move that was completed for the beginning of the fall 1956 term, under the leadership of Harold W. Tribble. From 1952 to 1956, fourteen new buildings were constructed on the new campus. These buildings were constructed in Georgian style. The old campus in Wake Forest was sold to the Baptist State Convention to establish the Southeastern Baptist Theological Seminary.

Desegregation
On April 27, 1962, Wake Forest's board of trustees voted to accept Edward Reynolds, a native of the African nation of Ghana, as the first black full-time undergraduate at the school. This made Wake Forest the first major private university in the South to desegregate. Reynolds, a transfer student from Shaw University, later became the first black graduate of the university in 1964, when he earned a bachelor's degree in history. Later, he went on to earn masters' degrees at Ohio University and Yale Divinity School, and a PhD in African history from the University of London in 1972. He became a professor of history at the University of California, San Diego, and author of several history books.

Recent history

A graduate studies program was inaugurated in 1961, and in 1967 the school became the fully accredited Wake Forest University. The Babcock Graduate School of Management, now known as the School of Business, was established in 1969. The James R. Scales Fine Arts Center opened in 1979.
 
In 1979, Wake Forest began a process to change its relationship with the Baptist State Convention of North Carolina, in order to obtain more academic freedom and choose non-Baptist trustees.
In 1986, Wake Forest gained autonomy from the Baptist State Convention of North Carolina and established a fraternal relationship with it.

The Middleton House and its surrounding  was deeded by gift to Wake Forest by Philip Hanes and his wife Charlotte in 1992. The donation was completed in 2011.

The thirteenth president of Wake Forest is Nathan O. Hatch, former provost at the University of Notre Dame. Hatch was officially installed as president on October 20, 2005. He assumed office on July 1, 2005, succeeding Thomas K. Hearn Jr., who had retired after 22 years in office. In 2020, Hatch would announce his retirement as president of Wake Forest. On January 29, 2021, the Wake Forest University Board of Trustees named  Susan Rae Wente as the university's 14th president and first female president of Wake Forest, replacing outgoing president Nathan Hatch.

On September 16, 2015, Wake Forest announced plans to offer undergraduate classes downtown in Innovation Quarter in Winston-Salem. On March 18, 2016, Wake Forest announced programs in biomedical sciences and engineering at its new Wake Downtown campus, opening in January 2017. Wake Downtown is in a former R.J. Reynolds Tobacco Company plant, next to the second campus of the school of medicine which opened in July 2016.

On February 21, 2020, Wake Forest would apologize for the institution's role in profiting and benefiting from enslaved people during slavery.

Wake Forest Baptist Medical Center and Atrium Health announced a partnership in 2019 with the goal of a Charlotte, North Carolina campus for the Wake Forest School of Medicine. More specific details were revealed in February 2021 including a seven-story tower, and on March 24, 2021, Atrium Health announced a 20-acre site at Baxter and McDowell Streets. Also, School of Medicine dean Dr. Julie Ann Freischlag said construction would start in 2022 with the first students attending in 2024. Hatch, who was leaving as president June 30, said Wake Forest would have a School of Professional Studies at the Charlotte location in 2022.

Presidential activities
On March 17, 1978, President Jimmy Carter made a major National Security address in Wait Chapel. The school has hosted presidential debates on two occasions. The first was between then-Vice President George H. W. Bush and Governor Michael Dukakis on September 25, 1988. The second matched then-Governor George W. Bush against Vice President Al Gore on October 11, 2000. Both debates were hosted in Wait Chapel.

Undergraduate admissions

Undergraduate admission to Wake Forest is rated as "most selective" by U.S. News & World Report.

Admission statistics for the class of 2021 are as follows: 13,000 applications were received. Representing 55 percent of the incoming class of 1350 freshmen, 750 members of the new class were enrolled through the early decision process – a 15 percent rise in applications than the previous year. Acceptance to Wake Forest has been offered to 25 percent of those who applied through the regular decision process. 54 percent of the class is composed of women. 34 percent are students of color. 22 percent come from North Carolina while 7 percent are international applicants. In order, the top eight states represented in the admitted class are North Carolina, Florida, New Jersey, Georgia, New York, California, and Virginia (with at least one person admitted from each of the fifty states). Students residing in 48 countries have been offered admission. 61 percent of admitted applicants who attend schools that calculate class rank are in the top 5 percent of their class, with 87 percent within the top 10 percent.

Test-optional policy
In May 2008, Wake Forest made college entrance exams optional for undergraduate admissions, becoming the first national university ranked in the top 30 by the U.S. News & World Report to adopt a test-optional policy. Being test-optional means Wake Forest's admissions process does not require applicants to submit their SAT or ACT scores, and students can decide if they want their standardized test scores to be considered.

Academics
Wake Forest alumni include 15 Rhodes Scholars, including 13 since 1986, four Marshall Scholars, 15 Truman Scholars and 62 Fulbright recipients since 1993. According to the National Science Foundation, Wake Forest spent $191 million on research and development in 2018, ranking it 117th in the nation.

Undergraduate
Wake Forest offers 40 undergraduate majors and 57 interdisciplinary minors across various fields of study. Students initially declare a major the second semester of their sophomore year.

In order to graduate, a Wake Forest student must finish three requirements for 120 hours of credit: a core set of classes, a course of study related to a major, and electives. The core set of classes includes basic requirements (a first-year seminar, a writing seminar, health and PE classes, and foreign language literature) and divisional requirements (at least two classes in each of the humanities, social sciences and math/natural sciences and at least one in the fine arts and literatures).

Wake Forest also offers an "Open Curriculum" option, in which a small number of students, approved by a committee, may design a course of study with an adviser that follows a liberal arts framework but does not necessarily fulfill all the core degree requirements.

In order to attend the School of Business, students must make a special application to its program, which offers an accountancy program whereby a student earns a BS and an MS in Accountancy and qualifies to sit for the CPA exam after five years of combined undergraduate and graduate study. The School of Business also offers undergraduate programs leading to degrees in business and enterprise management, finance and mathematical business.

Wake Forest supports a number of centers and institutes, which are designed to encourage interdisciplinary curriculum and programming. Currently, there are three institutes (Humanities, Pro Humanitate, and Eudaimonia) and eleven centers (including Nanotechnology and Molecular Materials; Enterprise Research and Education; Translational Science; Bioethics, Health and Society; BB&T Center for the Study of Capitalism; Energy, Environment and Sustainability; Molecular Communication and Signaling; and Interdisciplinary Performance and the Liberal Arts).

Faculty
Including the professional schools, the university has 1,996 faculty members, of whom 84.5 percent are full-time employees.

Ninety-three percent of undergraduate faculty have doctorates or other terminal degrees in their field. Wake Forest ranked tied for 10th best undergraduate teaching in the U.S. by U.S. News & World Report in its 2016 report, and the school maintains a faculty-to-student ratio of 1 to 11.

Notable faculty include:
 Anthony Atala, the director of the Wake Forest Institute for Regenerative Medicine, is considered a national pioneer in organ growth. His work has been lauded as the No. 1 Science Story of the Year by Discover Magazine in 2007 and the fifth-biggest breakthrough in medicine for 2011 by Time.
 David Carroll, professor of physics and director of the Center for Nanotechnology and Molecular Materials, is known for his research in nanoengineered cancer therapies, green technology, photovoltaics and lighting innovations.
 Melissa Harris-Perry, Presidential Endowed Professor of Politics and International Affairs, former host of the eponymous MSNBC current affairs and political commentary television program and current host of The Takeaway and Editor-at-Large of ELLE.com.
 President Nathan O. Hatch is a nationally known religious historian. His book, The Democratization of American Christianity, was named one of the "Five Best: Books on Religion in Politics" by the Wall Street Journal. He also serves as the chair of the NCAA Division I Board.
 David Faber, professor of art and printmaking, is a nationally recognized printmaker whose works are housed permanently at five of the country's leading museums.
 Author and civil rights activist Maya Angelou, Reynolds Professor of American Studies, taught at the university from 1982 until her death in 2014. Among her many awards, she was honored with the Presidential Medal of Freedom in 2010.
 Psychologist Linda Nielsen, researcher on the effects of shared parenting and on father–daughter relationships.

Study abroad
According to the Institute of International Education's 2012 Open Doors Report, Wake Forest ranked third in the country for undergraduate participation in study-abroad programs among doctoral research universities. According to the IIE's methodology, 72 percent of Wake Forest undergraduates received credit for studying abroad in the 2010–2011 academic year, with students spending anywhere from a few weeks to a summer to a full academic year visiting countries around the world. In January 2013, the university received the IIE's Heiskell Award for Study Abroad for its emphasis on providing foreign-based educational opportunities to first-generation college students.

Wake Forest offers more than 400 semester-, summer- and year-long study abroad programs in 200 cities in more than 70 countries worldwide through Wake Forest-sponsored programs and through Affiliate programs (approved non-Wake Forest programs).

Wake Forest programs options include:
 University-owned houses: Each semester or summer session, a resident professor leads a group of students to one of three University-owned study abroad houses and offers two courses in his or her respective disciplines. Resident professors are chosen from a wide variety of academic departments. The university houses are: Casa Artom in Venice, Italy; Flow House in Vienna, Austria; and Worrell House in London, England.
 Other University-sponsored semester study abroad programs take place in Santiago, Chile; Dijon, France; Cambridge, England; Salamanca, Spain; and Hirakata, Japan.

Graduate and professional schools
In addition to the Undergraduate College, Wake Forest University is home to the Graduate School of Arts and Sciences and four professional schools.

Wake Forest Graduate School of Arts and Sciences
The Graduate School of Arts and Sciences offers 25 programs of graduate-level study as well as 11 certificates. Degree programs include 11 areas of PhD study in the sciences, as well as 24 master's degrees in the arts and sciences. The school also offers nine joint degree programs in conjunction with the other professional schools and the undergraduate college.

Wake Forest School of Law

The Wake Forest University School of Law is a private American Bar Association (ABA) accredited law school and is a member of the Association of American Law Schools (AALS). The school was established in 1894. U.S. News & World Report consistently ranks the school among the Top Tier Law Schools in the nation. The current dean is Jane Aiken, who replaced former Dean Suzanne Reynolds following her retirement. Wake Forest University School of Law has a faculty of 52 Resident Faculty Members and 40 Extended Faculty Members.

Wake Forest Law offers the following degrees: the JD, the JD/M.Div., the JD/MA in Religion, the JD/MA in Bioethics, the Master of Studies in Law, the Master of Laws in American Law, the SJD and the JD/MBA in conjunction with the university's Schools of Business. Class sizes are limited to sections of 40 in the first year, with legal writing classes limited to sections of 20.

Wake Forest School of Medicine

The Wake Forest School of Medicine has one campus on the Bowman Gray Campus in the Ardmore neighborhood of Winston-Salem, North Carolina, and a second campus downtown which opened in July 2016. Founded in 1902, the School of Medicine directs the education of about 1,800 students and fellows, including physicians, basic scientists and allied clinical professionals each year. It is clinically affiliated with Wake Forest Baptist Health and Wake Forest Community Physicians and, with its research program, forms the integrated academic medical center, Wake Forest Baptist Medical Center.

In addition to MD, PhD and MS degrees (including an MS for physician assistants), the School of Medicine has five joint-degree programs, nurse anesthesia and medical technology teaching programs, and is the clinical site for 10 Forsyth Technical Community College programs.

In its 2016 edition, U.S. News & World Report ranked it tied for 52nd best in research and tied for 74th in primary care. The nurse anesthesia program is ranked 10th nationally.

The School of Medicine ranks among the top third of American medical schools in total funding from the National Institutes of Health (NIH). In the 2012 fiscal year, the school was awarded nearly $185 million in research funding from federal and state agencies, industry and other sources.

School of Business

The Wake Forest School of Business was founded in 1969 as the Babcock School of Management, and the school now houses both graduate and undergraduate programs in the new Farrell Hall facility on the main Wake Forest campus. The school also maintains a campus in Charlotte, N.C., which houses an MBA program for working professionals.

The School of Business offers seven Master programs and four joint-degree programs, including full-time and part-time Master of Business Administration, Master of Science in Accountancy, Master of Science in Business Analytics, and Master of Science in management. The school offers a Bachelor of Science (BS) degree program for undergraduates. This is a four-year degree with majors in accountancy, business and enterprise management, finance, and mathematical business.

Wake Forest School of Divinity

The School of Divinity, accredited by the Association of Theological Schools, offers a Master of Divinity degree as well as dual-degree programs in bioethics, counseling and law. The school also offers a certificate in Spirituality and Health in association with the Wake Forest School of Medicine.

Gail O'Day was appointed in 2010 as dean of the school and professor of New Testament and preaching. The school has 18 faculty members, five adjunct faculty and 12 associated faculty from other university departments. According to its mission statement, the school is "Christian by tradition, Baptist in heritage, and ecumenical in outlook." In April 2019, Jonathan L. Walton was appointed as the new dean of the divinity school.

Planning for the school began in April 1989.  In May 1996, Bill J. Leonard was appointed the school's first dean, and in March 1998, the school selected its 14-member board of visitors.  The first faculty members were named in April 1998, and additional faculty were hired that October. In August 1999, the first 24 students enrolled in the program. The university's first Master of Divinity degrees were conferred May 20, 2002.

In 2012, the school established the Food, Faith, and Religious Leadership Initiative to equip religious leaders with the knowledge, skills, and pastoral habits necessary to guide congregations and other faith-based organizations around food issues.

Rankings

In the 2021 U.S. News & World Report America's Best Colleges report, Wake Forest ranked tied for 44th for "Best Undergraduate Teaching", 24th for "Best Value", and tied for 28th overall among national universities in the U.S. Forbes ranked Wake Forest as 33rd in Research Universities and 46th in Private Colleges. U.S. News & World Report also ranked Wake Forest tied for 2nd among best national universities in North Carolina.

In the 2014 BusinessWeek Undergraduate Business Schools Rankings, the School of Business ranked 11th overall and achieved the No. 1 rank for the sixth consecutive year in Academic Quality.  In 2012, students in the MSA program achieved the No. 1 pass rate and the highest average score in the nation on the Certified Public Accountant Exam among candidates from nearly 800 colleges and universities. Wake Forest MSA students have earned the No. 1 CPA pass rate ranking ten times since 1997.

According to the Institute of International Education's 2012 Open Doors Report, Wake Forest ranked third in the country for undergraduate participation in study-abroad programs among doctoral research universities.

Student life

Fraternities and sororities
With 25 chapters, fraternity and sorority membership consists of around 45 percent of the undergraduate student population. Wake Forest requires that all new members of fraternities and sororities complete at least one semester of full-time studies, so the primary recruiting time is during the spring semester.

Most fraternities and sororities have lounges in campus residence halls, with surrounding rooms being reserved for the chapter. One fraternity, Delta Kappa Epsilon, has a residence off campus.

All fraternities and sororities at Wake Forest belong to one of three councils – the Interfraternity Council, the National Pan-Hellenic Council and the Panhellenic Council. Each of these councils has an executive board that provides resources and programming to its member organizations.

Fraternities on campus: Alpha Epsilon Pi, Alpha Phi Alpha, Alpha Sigma Phi, Chi Psi, Kappa Alpha Order, Kappa Alpha Psi, Lambda Chi Alpha, Omega Psi Phi, Pi Kappa Alpha, Sigma Alpha Epsilon, Sigma Chi, Sigma Pi, and Theta Chi.

Sororities on campus: Alpha Delta Pi, Alpha Kappa Alpha, Chi Omega, Delta Delta Delta, Delta Sigma Theta, Delta Xi Phi, Delta Zeta, Kappa Alpha Theta, Kappa Beta Gamma, Kappa Delta, and Kappa Kappa Gamma.

Professional or Academic Fraternities and Sororities on campus: Alpha Kappa Psi, Alpha Phi Omega, and Kappa Kappa Psi.

Wake Forest is also home to the Sigma Delta chapter of Order of Omega, an honor society for members of Greek organizations. Members are selected from the top three percent of Greeks on campus based on high standards in the areas of scholarship, leadership, and involvement within their respective organization and within the fraternity/sorority, campus and local communities.

In the mid-2010s, fraternities at Wake Forest began to come under more public scrutiny for claims of sexual assault, racism, and violence.

Athletic activities
Wake Forest offers classes in yoga, Pilates, High-Intensity Interval Training (HIIT), Zumba, BodyPump, and indoor cycling.  Wake Forest students field 36 club sport teams that compete against other colleges and universities at the regional and national level.  Over half of the student body participates in 18 different intramural sports. The university's fitness and recreation center, Reynolds Gym, is the oldest gym in the ACC.  It was renovated in March 2018 and renamed the Wake Forest Wellbeing Center.  The project includes the addition of the Sutton Center which opened in January 2016.

Dining facilities
Wake Forest undergraduate students living on campus are required to sign up for a meal plan in coordination with the Office of Residence Life and Housing and Aramark. Several dining rooms, a food court, bar and grill, Starbucks, and convenience stores are available.

Student media
 WAKE Radio was founded by a student group in 1985 after WFDD terminated a long-standing position of student broadcast assistants.  The organization currently maintains an Internet radio station that broadcasts shows ranging from political and sports talk to indie music.
 The Student was founded in 2004 and is a website created and run by students to help integrate the student body with academic activities and social events around campus and the Winston-Salem area.
 The Old Gold & Black (OGB) is Wake Forest University's weekly school newspaper. The paper takes its name from the university's official colors. It was established in 1916 and has been produced by a group of student editors, reporters and photographers every year since then. Notable alumni include Al Hunt, current managing editor for Bloomberg News in Washington DC, W. J. Cash who authored The Mind of the South, and Wayne King who won a Pulitzer Prize for his coverage of The 12th Street Riot in Detroit in 1967.
 Wake Forest Review is an independent student newspaper providing news and commentary "from a libertarian and conservative perspective."
 Wake TV is the university television channel. It features weekly television content like Wake TV News and Entertainment Wakely. Past students have also collaborated with ESPNU to create media packages featuring Wake Forest athletes.
 The Howler is the annual yearbook.
 3 to 4 Ounces is the official literary magazine on campus, publishing a collection of student prose, poetry and art through a blind application process each semester. It is also the longest-running media outlet on campus, as it began in 1882 as The Student when the school was still known as Wake Forest College.

Undergraduate student housing
Students are guaranteed housing for four years. , students were required to live on campus for their first three years as a full-time enrolled student.

The three main community areas for the 2013–2014 academic year are:
 South Campus (First Year Student Housing): Babcock Hall, Bostwick Hall, Johnson Hall, Luter Hall, Collins Hall, South Hall, Angelou Hall
 Quad Area (Upperclass Student Housing): Kitchin Hall, Davis Hall, Poteat/Huffman Halls, Taylor/Efird Halls
 North Area (Upperclass Student Housing): Magnolia Hall, Dogwood Hall, Polo Hall, Martin Hall, Palmer Hall, Piccolo Hall, North Campus Apartments, Student Apartments, Polo Road houses area.

Student Union
The event-planning arm of Wake Forest is undergraduate student-run organization known as Student Union. Student Union events include Homecoming, Family Weekend, Special Lectures, Concerts, the Coffeehouse music series and other weekly events such as movie screenings and Tuesday Trivia nights. Its signature event is the annual "Shag on the Mag" where a big tent covers Manchester Quad (formerly the Magnolia Quad) during Springfest and students shag dance to a live band. It started in 2005 under then Springfest chairman Joseph Bumgarner.

Student government
Founded in 1923, Wake Forest Student Government (known as SG) works under a semi-Presidential system. Four executive officers (Student Body President, Speaker of the House, Secretary and Treasurer) are elected each spring. The President appoints a Chief of Staff. The Executive Officers coordinate with the Cabinet, formed by the Co-Chairs of the seven standing committees. The seven committees are Academic, Campus Life, Diversity & Inclusion, Judiciary, Public Relations, Physical Planning, and The Student Organizations Council (SOC). The executive committee and Cabinet work with members of the Senate to pass legislation and advocate on behalf of students.

The Senate, which acts as a student legislature, is made up of about 60 senators, chosen in fall and spring elections each year. The legislators are assigned to one of seven committees focused on an area of student needs. The student trustee is an ex-officio member of Student Government and acts as a liaison between the board of trustees and Student Government.

Personal and career development
In 2009, President Nathan Hatch outlined in his strategic plan a campus culture in which personal and career development would become an integral component of the undergraduate student experience. Later that year, he created a cabinet-level position and appointed Andy Chan as the vice president for personal and career development.

Chan's work has included hosting a national conference in 2012 ("Rethinking Success: From the Liberal Arts to Careers in the 21st Century") featuring Condoleezza Rice, and issuing "A Roadmap for Transforming the College-To-Career Experience" in 2013. Wake Forest quadrupled the size of the staff, integrated personal and career development into freshman orientation, and added "College to Career" courses.

Arts
Every student takes at least one course in the arts (art history, studio art, theatre, dance, music performance and music in liberal arts) before graduating. In 2011–2012, more than 500 Wake Forest students were directly involved in performances on campus, and 110 public exhibitions in theatre, music dance and visual arts held in Scales Fine Arts Center in 2012–2013. The university's home, Winston-Salem, calls itself the "City of Arts & Innovation".

Students also can take advantage of a number of other art-related opportunities:
 The WFU Art Collections consist of nine independent collections with more than 1,600 works located in 35 on- and off-campus locations. Every four years, selected students make an art-buying trip to New York City to add to the collections.
 Students are within walking distance of the Reynolda House Museum of American Art, the Wake Forest Museum of Anthropology, the Charlotte and Philip Hanes Art Gallery and START, the student art gallery.
 The Theatre Department, which allows students to participate from their first year, supports interdisciplinary exploration of its plays through the Interdisciplinary Performance and the Liberal Arts Center (IPLACe), which connects the performing arts and other academic departments.
 The student-run Reynolda Film Festival is a free weeklong series of film screenings and workshops featuring a keynote address by a well-known and respected representative of the film industry.
 The Secrest Artists Series offers the Wake Forest community several free opportunities each year to hear world-class concerts.

Athletics

Originally, Wake Forest's athletic teams were known as The Old Gold and Black or the Baptists, due to its association with the Baptist Convention (from which it later separated itself). However, in 1923, after a particularly impressive win against the Duke Blue Devils, a newspaper reporter wrote that the Deacons "fought like Demons", giving rise to the current team name, the "Demon Deacons".

Wake Forest's Athletic teams has won a total of nine NCAA team  national championships in five different sports. The women's field hockey team has won three (2002, 2003, 2004), the men's golf team has won three (1974, 1975, 1986), the men's soccer team (2007), the baseball team (1955), and men's tennis (2018) have won one each. Wake Forest is sometimes referred to as being a part of "Tobacco Road" or "The Big Four", terms that refer to the four North Carolina schools that compete heatedly against each other within the ACC; these include Duke, North Carolina, and North Carolina State, as well as Wake Forest.

The Wake Forest Demon Deacons participate in the NCAA's Division I (in the Bowl Subdivision for football) and in the Atlantic Coast Conference. Men's sports include baseball, basketball, cross country, football, golf, soccer, tennis, and track & field; women's sports include basketball, cross country, field hockey, golf, soccer, tennis, track & field, and volleyball.

Football

Wake Forest plays its home football games at Truist Field (formerly Groves Stadium). The Demon Deacons have won two ACC Football Championships. The program also have had four players named as ACC Player of the Year, three consensus All-Americans, including 15 bowl appearances.

Men's basketball

Wake Forest is generally regarded as a competitive program in men's basketball, frequently qualifying for the NCAA tournament (23 times in the school's history). They reached the Final Four once, in 1962.

The school's famous basketball alumni include Billy Packer, a guard on the 1962 Final Four team who became far more famous as a basketball broadcaster; Tyrone Curtis "Muggsy" Bogues, the shortest player ever to play in the NBA; Randolph Childress, for his MVP performance in the 1995 ACC tournament; Washington Wizards swingman Josh Howard; Dallas Mavericks forward James Johnson; Chris Paul of the Phoenix Suns, 2006 NBA Rookie of the Year Award,9-time NBA All-star; and two-time league MVP, Five-time NBA Champion and three-time NBA Finals MVP Tim Duncan, John Collins of the Atlanta Hawks, and former Milwaukee Bucks starting point guard and 2015 NBA all-star Jeff Teague. Lawrence Joel Veterans Memorial Coliseum is the home venue for the Demon Deacons basketball team.

Women's basketball

In 2012, Jen Hoover took over as coach from Mike Petersen, the program's all-time winningest coach. Hoover (then Jenny Mitchell) is the program's all-time leading scorer and rebounder, was a three-time All-ACC selection and was a member of the ACC's 50th Anniversary Team in 2002. Hoover was part of the program's only NCAA tournament appearance in 1988, when Wake Forest beat Villanova and lost to Tennessee. Wake Forest has appeared in the Women's NIT four times, all under Petersen. In 2015, Dearica Hamby was drafted 6th overall in the WNBA draft by the San Antonio Stars (now Las Vegas Aces).

Women's field hockey
Recent athletic honors include three consecutive NCAA Field Hockey national championships in 2002, 2003, and 2004 under Head Coach Jennifer Averill. In 2005, the Deacs were defeated in the semifinal round by Duke University, and in the 2006 championship game by the University of Maryland.

Golf
Wake Forest has had several successful golf teams, winning national championships in 1974, 1975, and 1986. Several well-known players include Jay Haas, Billy Andrade, Gary Hallberg, Robert Wrenn, Scott Hoch, Bill Haas, Will Zalatoris, and majors champions Arnold Palmer, Lanny Wadkins, Darren Clarke, Curtis Strange, and Webb Simpson.

Soccer

Wake Forest is a consistent national title contender in men's soccer. In recent years several players from the program have played professionally in Major League Soccer, including Brian Carroll, Will Hesmer, Justin Moose, Michael Parkhurst, Pat Phelan, James Riley, Scott Sealy, Matt Taylor, and Wells Thompson. In 2006 the team advanced to the final four of the NCAA tournament where they were defeated in a penalty kick shootout by UC Santa Barbara. They captured the 2007 NCAA Men's Soccer Championship defeating Ohio State 2–1, with the winning goal scored by Zack Schilawski. The Demon Deacons returned to the final four of the 2009 Division I Men's College Cup, losing to Virginia 2–1 in overtime in the semifinals. The Demon Deacons reached the NCAA Championship game again in 2016, losing to Stanford in the College Cup Championship.

Baseball

Wake Forest won the 1955 College World Series in baseball.
In 2009, the team began playing at David F. Couch Ballpark, in Winston-Salem, NC, moving to this field from their former home at Gene Hooks Stadium on campus. In 2017, eight players were selected in the 2017 MLB Draft, the most in the Wake Forest Baseball history.

Tennis

Noah Rubin played for Wake Forest; he had won the 2014 boys singles championship at Wimbledon, and the US 2014 boys' national championships in singles and doubles. In 2014–2015 for Wake Forest he was an All-American and the runner-up in the 2015 NCAA singles championship.

On May 22, 2018, the Wake Forest Men's Tennis team won its first ever NCAA National Championship. This feat was accomplished on their home courts, as they defeated the Ohio State Men's Tennis team 4–2.
Wake Forest had been ranked as the number one team for most of the season leading up to the tournament.

Screamin' Demons
Student attendance of Wake Forest Football and Basketball games is high, in part due to the program known as "Screamin' Demons". At the beginning of each respective athletic season students on the Reynolda Campus can sign up for the program whereby they pay $40 for each year; in addition to the best seats at the games, this gets students a football shirt in the fall and a tie-dye T-shirt in the spring along with a card that serves as an automatic pass to the sporting events. They lose this privilege if they miss two of the games. Through the planning of Sports Marketing and the Screamin' Demons program, basketball game seats in the students section are difficult to attain without participating in the Screamin' Demons program. The arena can seat only 2,250 of the 4,500 undergraduate students at Wake Forest. At least 150 seats are always set aside for non-Screamin Demons, who sit behind the 2,100 member group.

Student organizations
There are over 225 chartered student organizations of all sorts. Student sports organizations are highly visible on campus. Special interest organizations range from the academic, such the Model United Nations team, to the artistic, such as the handbell choir. In spring of 2006, the Mock Trial team was notable in qualifying for the national tournament while only in its 2nd year in operation. Religious organizations are also numerous. Both the College Republicans and College Democrats have active chapters at the university. Historic student organizations such as the Philomathesians, an artistic literary magazine, are also present. Students are entertained by numerous performing groups, including The Lilting Banshees Comedy Troupe, The Living Parables Christian Drama Troupe, and The Anthony Aston Players.

The Office of Student Engagement, oversees all student organizations and fraternities and sororities. Student Engagement also organizes leadership oriented student activities such as CHARGE (Formerly called LEAD), a semester long course in campus leadership.

Debate team
The Wake Forest Debate team has won the National Debate Tournament in 1997 and 2008, made the finals in 2006 and 2009 and has had six semifinal teams: 1955, 1993, 1994, 1995, 2017 and 2019. Wake Forest has had two winners of the "National Coach of the Year" award: Ross Smith (1997) and Al Louden (1988). The award is named for Smith.

Notable Debate alumni include: Daveed Gartenstein-Ross, the director of the Center for the Study of Terrorist Radicalization at the Foundation for Defense of Democracies; Larry Penley, the former president of Colorado State University; John Graham, the former regulatory czar for George W. Bush; and Franklin Shirley and Martha Swain Wood, both former mayors of Winston-Salem, N.C.

In 2010, Wake Forest became the first top-tier debate team in the country to go "open source" and share all its evidence and arguments online through a wiki accessible to other debaters.

Volunteer Service Corps
The Volunteer Service Corps (VSC) is one of the most popular student organizations. It coordinates volunteering in both the local and international/national setting via service projects and trips. The organization has annual service trips to Russia, Vietnam, and Latin America. In light of the disaster caused by Hurricane Katrina, VSC sent 30 Wake Students on a Wake Alternative Spring Break in the Spring of 2006.

Army ROTC
Wake Forest University offers an Army ROTC program. In 2006 the Army ROTC program was awarded the MacArthur Award by the United States Army for having the best medium-sized ROTC battalion in the nation. There are about sixty cadets in the program, and about half of each military science class finishes Leadership Development Advanced Camp (LDAC) as a "Distinguished Military Graduate", the top 20 percent of ROTC graduates.

The minimum service commitment of a contracted cadet who graduates from ROTC is four years active duty and four years of inactive reserve duty after that. Alternatively, a cadet can choose to forgo active duty service and serve eight straight years in the active Reserve or National Guard. Other alternative service plans are available for those who intend to be an army doctor, lawyer, or chaplain with source of commissioning via ROTC.

At Wake Forest contracted ROTC cadets are given full scholarship, a monthly stipend, and book money by the US Army. The university extends the scholarship with free room and board.

The program also serves students from Winston-Salem State University and Salem College.

Diversity and inclusion
On April 27, 1962, the board of trustees voted to end racial segregation at Wake Forest, which became the South's first major private university to integrate. In the fall of 1962, Ghana native Ed Reynolds became the first full-time black undergraduate student to enroll. In 2012–2013, Wake Forest's celebration, "Faces of Courage", marked the 50th anniversary of Wake Forest's decision to integrate and how it shaped the university.

Wake Forest's undergraduate minority enrollment in 2014–2015 was 25 percent. The university has an official "Statement of Principle on Diversity".

Other diversity milestones:
 Japanese student Konsukie Akiyama became the first Asian graduate in 1909.
 The first women undergraduates were admitted in 1942.
 James G. Jones became the first American Indian graduate in 1958.
 On February 23, 1960, ten Wake Forest students joined eleven students from Winston-Salem State Teachers College (present-day Winston-Salem State University) for a sit-in at Woolworth's lunch counter in downtown Winston-Salem. The students' non-violent protest, along with other protests in Winston-Salem, led to the desegregation of the city's restaurants and lunch counters on May 23 of that year.
 Martin Luther King Jr. spoke in Wait Chapel on the Wake Forest campus on October 11, 1962.
 Herman Eure (biology) and Dolly McPherson (English) became the first black tenure-track professors in 1974.
 The Office of Minority Affairs was formed in 1978 and later became the Office of Multicultural Affairs. Wake Forest also added an Office of Diversity & Inclusion, an LGBTQ Center, and a Women's Center.
 In 1982, poet/actress/author Maya Angelou was hired as Reynolds Professor of American Studies.
 In 2002, Wake Forest added a cultural diversity requirement  to its curriculum, mandating all undergraduates take one of 74 courses to educate them on cultural diversity.
 Wake Forest appointed its first (part-time) Muslim chaplain in 2010.  In 2011, the first associate chaplain for Jewish Life was named.

Recognition
Wake Forest's Associate Provost for Diversity and Inclusion Barbee Oakes was named one of the "25 Women Making a Difference" in 2012 Diverse Issues in Higher Education, recognizing her for commitment to initiatives that promote pluralism and foster community.  Wake Forest was among 40 schools across the country awarded the 2012 Higher Education Excellence in Diversity Award by Insight into Diversity magazine.

Technology
Wake Forest has received praise for its efforts in the field of technology. In 2003, The Princeton Review listed it as the number-two "Most Connected Campus" in the United States.  The university's Information Systems (IS) department offers a program that issues new Lenovo ThinkPad laptop computers to all undergraduate students and faculty. High speed wireless (and wired) Internet access is provided across campus.

Campus-wide access is provided for a variety of collaborative tools, including WebEx, Google Apps for Higher Education (used for WFU email, calendaring and documents) and Sakai.

Wake Forest is a founding member of WinstonNet, a non-profit organization of educational and municipal institutions in Winston-Salem that, among other things, provides a gigabit ethernet based regional point of presence (or, rPOP) for the North Carolina Research and Education Network. The university is a member of the Inter-university Consortium for Political and Social Research (ICPSR), providing access to a large library of data files, and of EDUCAUSE, a national consortium of colleges and universities concerned with computing issues.

Campuses

Reynolda campus

The Reynolda Campus is the main campus for Wake Forest University, housing the undergraduate colleges, three of the four graduate schools, and half the Graduate School of Arts and Sciences. The core of Reynolda campus is the two interlinked quads, separated by the main administrative building/main dining facility, Reynolda Hall, into North and South Campus.

North Campus consists of the T.K. Hearn Plaza, better known as "the quad", which holds six upperclassmen residential buildings, Subway restaurant, a book/office supply store, a clothing/athletic store, and Wait Chapel. Wait Chapel serves multiple functions. Its auditorium serves as an area for prayer, ceremonies, concerts, and certain guest speakers. The classrooms at Wait Chapel house the offices and classrooms for the Divinity School and the Religion Department.

South Campus is the home of Manchester Quad (formerly known as the Magnolia Quad or Mag quad). It holds freshman housing, most of the classroom buildings, the Benson Center, and the Z. Smith Reynolds Library.

Bowman Gray campus
Located in the Ardmore neighborhood near downtown Winston-Salem, the Bowman Gray Campus is home to Wake Forest Baptist Medical Center, which includes its teaching and research arm, Wake Forest School of Medicine, and its clinical enterprise, Wake Forest Baptist Health. With about 13,000 employees, the Medical Center is the largest employer in the Piedmont Triad Region, operating as an integrated health care system.

Wake Downtown campus
275 students attended classes on January 10, 2017, the first day of 18 undergraduate classes in such areas as engineering and biomedical sciences at Wake Downtown in Wake Forest Innovation Quarter.

Charlotte campus

The Charlotte Center is home to U.S. News & World Reports No. 1 ranked part-time MBA program for working professionals in North Carolina. It offers two part-time MBA programs (Evening and Saturday), continuing legal education courses, continuing professional education courses, executive education, Lunch & Learn and speaker events. Certificate programs offered at the Charlotte Center include business management for nonprofits, sustainability, financial planning and negotiations. The center also hosts corporate retreats and serves as an educational and gathering space for students and alumni in the greater Charlotte area.

The university began offering a small set of general summer school classes at the Charlotte campus in the summer of 2014.

Affiliated properties

Lawrence Joel Veterans Memorial Coliseum

Wake Forest purchased the Coliseum and 33 surrounding acres from the City of Winston-Salem on August 1, 2013. The Coliseum, which seats 14,407, has been the home of Wake Forest's men's and women's basketball teams since it opened in 1989.

Overseas
The university owns international properties in Italy, Austria, England, and Nicaragua.

Casa Artom in Venice

In 1974, Wake Forest purchased the building that formerly housed the American Consulate in Venice and named it Casa Artom in honor of Camillo Artom, a professor at the Baptist Medical Center until 1969. Casa Artom is a two-story building facing the Grand Canal. It is flanked by the Palazzo Venier dei Leoni, which houses the Peggy Guggenheim art collection, and the 15th century home Ca'Dario. Each fall and spring semester, a group of Wake Forest students and a resident professor live and study together here.

Flow House in Vienna
In 1998, Wake Forest purchased a three-story villa in Vienna. The acquisition was made possible through the donation of Vic and Roddy Flow of Winston-Salem, and the house was named in their honor. Built in 1898, the house was formerly the office of the U.S. Consulate. Flow House is situated in a northwest section of Vienna that is known for its embassies, diplomatic residences, and distinguished private homes. Each fall and spring semester, a group of Wake Forest students and a resident professor live and study together here.

Worrell House in London
In 1977, Wake Forest acquired a large, brick home in Hampstead for its London program. The house, a gift from Eugene and Ann Worrell, was named in their honor. Formerly known as Morven House, the building served as the home and studio of landscape painter Charles Edward Johnson. Hampstead is primarily a residential neighborhood and home to Hampstead Heath, Regent's Park, Primrose Hill and the Keats House. Each fall and spring semester, a group of Wake Forest undergraduate students and a resident professor live and study together here. Wake Forest law students also spend a summer session here along with a resident law professor.

Casa Dingledine Conference Center in Managua, Nicaragua
The facility provides a venue for the exchange of ideas between and among not only Wake Forest constituents, but also the university's Nicaraguan partners, other academic institutions and corporate entities. The center is critical to the mission of the Nicaragua Nexus, which is to accomplish the Wake Forest motto of Pro Humanitate by working with Nicaraguans to enhance their quality of life through collaborative partnerships with local and international organizations in Nicaragua, while providing transformational experiences for students and faculty. Casa Dingledine was dedicated in February 2011.

Reynolda House Museum of American Art

Reynolda House Museum of American Art is the centerpiece of the Reynolda Estate, from which the university's Reynolda Campus takes its name. The residence was constructed in 1917 by Katharine Smith Reynolds and her husband, Richard Joshua Reynolds, founder of the R.J. Reynolds Tobacco Company.  It was converted to an art museum in 1967 and has been affiliated with Wake Forest University since 2002.

Reynolda House displays American art ranging from the colonial period to the present, including well-known artists such as Mary Cassatt, Frederic Church, Jacob Lawrence, Georgia O'Keeffe, and Gilbert Stuart.

Wake Forest students regularly get involved at Reynolda House through internships, volunteer opportunities, and academic research. In 2010, Reynolda House and Wake Forest partnered on a first-year student orientation project that uses the museum's masterpiece by Frederic Church, The Andes of Ecuador, as the focal point of the summer academic experience. General admission to the museum is free to students and university employees.

Reynolda Gardens

The  property that comprise Reynolda Gardens of Wake Forest University was once at the center of Reynolda, the early 20th-century estate of Mr. and Mrs. R. J. Reynolds, and included a lake, golf course, formal gardens, greenhouses, and woods. Although many changes have occurred to the landscape over the past century, this preserve serves as a learning center for topics related to horticulture, environmental sciences, and landscape history. Wake Forest students and faculty engage in research throughout the preserve. The public is invited to participate in a wide variety of learning experiences, including classes, workshops, summer camps, and special events.

Reynolda Village

Adjacent to the Wake Forest campus, Reynolda Village is home to stores, restaurants, services and offices. Now owned and operated by Wake Forest University, the buildings were originally part of the  estate of the R.J. Reynolds family. These buildings were modeled after an English Village and included dairy barns, a cattle shed, school, post office, smokehouse, blacksmith shop, carriage house, central power and heating plant, as well as cottages to house the family's chauffeur and stenographer, the village's school master, and the farm's head dairyman and horticulturist. The present-day village has a wide range of shops specializing in home furnishings and designer fashions, as well as art galleries, fitness studios, and a full-service day spa. The Reynolda historical district, including Reynolda Village, serves as an educational, cultural, and community complex for the Winston-Salem community.

Graylyn International Conference Center
Wake Forest University owns and manages one of the premier meeting destinations in the southeast. Graylyn was built as a private estate for Bowman Gray, Sr., and his family in 1932. The Gray family lived in the home until 1946 when it was donated to the Bowman Gray School of Medicine. In 1972, it was donated to Wake Forest University where it was used for many things over the years, including graduate student housing.

University Corporate Center
Built as the world headquarters for Reynolds Tobacco Company, RJR Nabisco donated the more than  building to Wake Forest University in 1987.  Now known as the University Corporate Center, the building is located off Reynolds Boulevard, near campus, and houses the following University offices: Information Systems, Finance Systems, Procurement Services, and Financial and Accounting Services. Aon Consulting, BB&T, and Pepsi are also tenants.

WFDD

WFDD is an NPR-affiliate which was founded in 1946. The station has a signal strength of 36,000 watts and broadcasts to 32 counties in North Carolina and Virginia. The station has been broadcast on 88.5 FM since 1967.

Wake Forest Innovation Quarter

The opening of Wake Forest Biotech Place in February 2012 marked a milestone in
development of Wake Forest Innovation Quarter, based in downtown Winston-Salem and formerly known as Piedmont Triad Research Park. Operated by Wake Forest Baptist Medical Center, Wake Forest Biotech Place is a  multipurpose biotechnology research and innovation center space that is the present-day home of several School of Medicine departments doing pioneering research, as well as private companies.

In December 2012 the Wake Forest Baptist Medical Center formally launched its new commercialization enterprise, Wake Forest Innovations. Located in the Innovation Quarter, Wake Forest Innovations brings together technology asset management functions with resources to support scholarship, invest in the innovative potential of its academic and clinical communities and help translate ideas and discoveries into commercial products and services for both the Medical Center and Wake Forest University.

In January 2017, undergraduate programs began at Wake Downtown.

Wake Forest University Press

Wake Forest is the home of Wake Forest University Press. Established in 1976 by Irish scholar Dillon Johnston, with the support of Provost Edwin Wilson and President James Ralph Scales, the press is the premier publisher of Irish poetry in North America. Among the poets published are Ciaran Carson, Thomas Kinsella, Michael Longley, Medbh McGuckian, John Montague, Eilean Ni Chuilleanain and Irish language poet Nuala Ni Dhomhnaill.

Alumni

Wake Forest has over 72,000 living alumni, with 39% living in North Carolina and others residing in 97 foreign countries.
 Marc Blucas, actor.
 Muggsy Bogues, NBA basketball player (ret.)
 Richard Burr, United States Senator
 David Chase, creator of The Sopranos
 Mary P. Easley, First Lady of North Carolina
 Carroll O'Connor, actor
 J. P. Carter, mayor of Madison, NC and Lieutenant-Colonel in the United States Army
 Charlie Crist, US House of Representatives of the State of Florida's 13th district
 James DuBose, award-winning television producer, entertainment industry executive and Rising Star Award receipint
 Tim Duncan, NBA Player, 5–time NBA Champion, 15–time NBA All-star (ret.) 
 Bob Ehrlich, former governor, Maryland  (Wake Forest law school graduate, Princeton alumnus)
 Charlie Ergen, co-founder and chairman of EchoStar and Dish Network
 Kay Hagan, former US Senator, D-NC (a graduate of Florida State University and Wake Forest Law School)
 Melissa Harris-Perry
 Jesse Helms, U.S. senator
 Cheslie Kryst, (Wake Forest Law School graduate), Miss USA 2019
 Michael Maxey, president of Roanoke College. Undergraduate degree in history and master's degree in counselor education from WFU.
 Arnold Palmer, professional golf player
 Chris Paul, NBA basketball player
 Brian Piccolo, American football player, Chicago Bears 1965–1970 at death.
 Aravind Swamy, Indian actor and businessman
 Robert Wilkie, former United States Secretary of Veterans Affairs

Movies or documentaries filmed at the university
 A Union In Wait
 The 5th Quarter
 The Longest Ride

Notes

References

External links

 
 Wake Forest Athletics website

 
Educational institutions established in 1834
Universities and colleges accredited by the Southern Association of Colleges and Schools
Private universities and colleges in North Carolina
Universities and colleges in Winston-Salem, North Carolina
1834 establishments in North Carolina